In geometry, the elongated hexagonal bipyramid is constructed by elongating a hexagonal bipyramid (by inserting a hexagonal prism between its congruent halves).

Related polyhedra

This polyhedron is in the family of elongated bipyramids, of which the first three can be Johnson solids: J14, J15, and J16. The hexagonal form can be constructed by all regular faces but is not a Johnson solid because 6 equilateral triangles would form six co-planar faces (in a regular hexagon).

Uses 
 A quartz crystal is an example of an elongated hexagonal bipyramid. Because it has 18 faces, it can be called an octadecahedron. Other chemicals also have this shape.
 The edge-first orthogonal projection of a 24-cell is an elongated hexagonal bipyramid.
 Used as the shape of Fruit Gushers candy.
 Used as a physical manifestation for assisting various branches of three-dimensional graph theory.

References

Pyramids and bipyramids